The C.E. McEachron General Merchandise is a historic two-story building in Hill City, South Dakota. It was built in 1902 by Charles E. McEachron, an investor who also owned the local bank. McEachron was born in New York state in 1855 and he moved to the Dakota Territory as a pioneer in 1880; he died in 1939. The building has been listed on the National Register of Historic Places since June 3, 1994.

References

National Register of Historic Places in Pennington County, South Dakota
Early Commercial architecture in the United States
Commercial buildings completed in 1902
1902 establishments in South Dakota